Frédéric Riveta (born 19 July 1954) is a French Polynesian politician and former Cabinet Minister. He is a member of Tapura Huiraatira.

Riveta has been mayor of Rurutu since 1995. He was first elected to the Assembly of French Polynesia in the 1996 French Polynesian legislative election. he served as a Minister several times in the Flosse , Tong Sang and Temaru governments, holding the positions of Agriculture, Fisheries and Rural Economy. 

On 1 March 2011 he was sacked from the government of Gaston Tong Sang for failing to support the budget. He was replaced as a Minister by Louis Frébault. He was re-elected to the Assembly at the 2013 election and elected third vice-president. In September 2014 he was appointed Minister of Agriculture and Island Development in the government of Édouard Fritch.  In October 2015 he resigned from the executive and returned to the ranks of the Assembly to strengthen Fritch's majority, his substitute being a supporter of Gaston Flosse.

During the founding congress of the Tapura Huiraatira in 2016 he was elected one of the party's vice-presidents.

He was re-elected to the Assembly at the 2018 election. In 2020 he was re-elected for a fifth term as Mayor of Rurutu.

References

Living people
1954 births
People from the Austral Islands
Tahoera'a Huiraatira politicians
Tapura Huiraatira politicians
Members of the Assembly of French Polynesia
Government ministers of French Polynesia
Mayors of places in French Polynesia